The Women's 400 metre freestyle event at the 2010 Commonwealth Games took place on 8 October 2010, at the SPM Swimming Pool Complex.

Three heats were held, with most containing the maximum number of swimmers (eight). The heat in which a swimmer competed did not formally matter for advancement, as the swimmers with the top eight times from the entire field qualified for the finals.

Heats

Heat 1

Heat 2

Heat 3

Final

References

Aquatics at the 2010 Commonwealth Games
2010 in women's swimming